The Grammy Award for Best Contemporary Christian Music Performance/Song is a category at the annual Grammy Awards. It was first awarded in 2015. It combined two previously separate categories in the Gospel/Contemporary Christian Music field, Best Contemporary Christian Music Song and Best Gospel/Contemporary Christian Music Performance. The new category recognizes both songwriters and performers (solo/duos/groups/collaborations/etc.) and is open for singles or tracks only. Songwriters are only awarded a Grammy Award if it is a newly written song. Grammy's for cover versions of previously recorded songs are awarded to the performer(s) only.

Along with the Best Gospel Performance/Song category, these mark the only Grammy categories which honor both performers and songwriters in one category.

These changes were made in June 2014 by the National Academy of Recording Arts and Sciences "in the interest of clarifying the criteria, representing the current culture and creative DNA of the gospel and Contemporary Christian Music communities, and better reflecting the diversity and authenticity of today's gospel music industry."

According to the Grammy committee, the move recognizes "the critical contribution of both songwriters and performers by combining  songwriters and artists into the Best Gospel Performance/Song and Best Contemporary Christian Music Performance/Song categories."

Gospel performances, which were previously recognized in the Best Gospel/Contemporary Christian Music Performance category, are included in the Best Gospel Performance/Song category.

Recipients

 The official nominations list did not list the songwriters. This information is taken from the credits notice on Spotify.

See also
Grammy Award for Best Gospel Song
Grammy Award for Best Contemporary Christian Music Song
Grammy Award for Best Gospel Performance/Song
Grammy Award for Song of the Year

References

General
  Note: User must select the "Gospel" category as the genre under the search feature.

Specific

External links
 Official site

2015 establishments in the United States
Awards established in 2015
Contemporary Christian
Songwriting awards